Catherine Elizabeth Snow (born December 14, 1945) is an educational psychologist and applied linguist. In 2009 Snow was appointed to the Patricia Albjerg Graham Professorship in the Harvard Graduate School of Education, having previously held the Henry Lee Shattuck Professorship also in the Harvard Graduate School of Education.  Snow is past president of the American Educational Research Association (2000-2001). She chaired the RAND Corporation 'reading study group' from 1999.

Snow has contributed to theories of bilingualism and language acquisition through parent-child interaction. With Brian MacWhinney, Snow founded the Child Language Data Exchange System (CHILDES) database, a corpus of children's speech used by numerous language acquisition researchers. More recently, Snow's research has focused on early childhood literacy, investigating linguistic and social factors that contribute to or detract from literacy. With Anat Ninio, Snow published extensively on pragmatic development.

She is also on the advisory board of FFIPP-USA (Faculty for Israeli-Palestinian Peace-USA), a network of Palestinian, Israeli, and International faculty, and students, working for an end of the Israeli occupation of Palestinian territories and for just peace.

Bilingualism research

Home factors 
Snow was interested in the relationship of individual home conditions and the ability to become proficient in two languages. In order to determine the role of vocabulary in the bilingual population a series of experiments were conducted analyzing the consequences of the socio economic status (SES) of individuals as well as language predictors in both of the languages in question—Spanish and English. The sample was a group of 96 fifth-grade Latino English language learners of varying SES. In order to determine what the SES was for the sample the following factors were considered—mother's education and individual income per household. Vocabulary development was found to be linked to the literacy practices of the individual as well as the family which varies across the SES of the households. Environmental factors played a role in the literacy of individuals. The number of books in the household as well as the amount that the parents read accounted for 51% of the variability in literacy. Personal factors—help from guardians in areas such as homework, reading with the child, and telling stories—accounted for 65% variation in both languages. The statistics had an internal reliability of .71 for Spanish and .72 for English indicating that the results are relatively consistent. Analysis of parental language showed that the maternal preference for English explained about 59% of variation in literacy with a reliability of .9 indicating that the factor was relatively consistent. Another factor that was considered to explain parental preference explained only 13% of variability of literacy among individuals with an internal reliability of .85. The high correlation between these factors led to the conclusion that multiple resources are necessary for a child to become proficient in both their first and second languages. It was also found that parental language preference relates to the proficiency of the child in both languages. Children in homes that used mainly English tended to have a higher proficiency in English, and predominantly Spanish speakers tended to have a higher proficiency in Spanish. For parental preference when Spanish was the first language, it was found that the father's language preference was more predictive of the child's proficiency in that particular language. For preference in the English language, both maternal and paternal preference were significant factors in predicting the proficiency of a particular language. Even if Spanish was preferred in an initially English speaking home, the child had a higher proficiency in the Spanish language.

Snow took part in research where the focus was to see if home factors such as family characteristics and home language use had an influence on a child's English and Spanish vocabulary. The study was conducted with Latino children where Spanish was most commonly spoken in the home. They administered a questionnaire to the families that were going to participate in the study. The questions included information of the family's background, home-language use and home literacy environment. The home factors that were looked at included parental education, parental English proficiency, previous school attendance, mothers working status, literacy resources in the home and number of books at home, along with other factors. The study found that family income did not have an impact on the child's vocabulary and that children in low-income households were more expressive during book sharing activities having a positive impact on the child's vocabulary. Spanish did become less dominant in the home compared to English because home factors. One home factor that decreased the child's vocabulary in Spanish is that many of the books that are resourced are in English rather than Spanish causing book sharing time at home with the child to be mainly in English than in Spanish. English is introduced to minority children through factors inside and outside of the home, resulting in a child's increase in English vocabulary which demonstrates how English holds a higher status in society. The study also noted how the more exposure a child had to either a parent, relative or sibling read to them the better it impacted the child's vocabulary. In the home, the more exposure a child has to language the richer their vocabulary.

Maternal factors 
Snow's research studied if the mother's interaction had an impact on the child's vocabulary in both English and Spanish. The study looked at a sample of Latino children where Spanish was the predominant language. The research used home visits as a way to collect data on maternal factors. The home visits involved parental interviews, observing book sharing between the mother and the child and the mothers also had to complete a vocabulary test. Some questions that came up in the parental interview was the differences between their culture and the United States and also their beliefs of language acquisition and literacy. The book that was used to examine the mothers interaction with the child during book sharing time was Frog Where Are You? a picture book without words, by Mercer Mayer. The objective of this was because this book provided the tools for a child to create narratives if the mother encouraged this response during the activity. The study found that when mother's used labeling questions during book sharing time, it had a positive impact on the child's vocabulary. When the mother used labeling questions it also had a strong a positive connection with Spanish vocabulary while it also had a weaker and positive connection with English vocabulary. The study also found how Spanish culture may have an effect in having their children have open ended responses with their mothers. The more the mother spoke in English the negative result it had in the child's Spanish vocabulary but positively impacted the child's English vocabulary. Mother and child interaction has a positive influence on cognitive skills and lexical development.

Perspectives 
Snow participated in a guide in 1992 called Educational Researcher, published by American Educational Research Association to answer some questions and explain the research behind second language development. The following are many common questions that have been presented to her and the others writing the guide: what are the consequences of bilingualism, why might someone have more trouble than others learning an addition language, what are the individual differences in bilingualism and many more. Snow's section was called Perspectives on Second-Language Development: Implication for Bilingual Education which described 4 different approaches of studying, recording the history of and the research of bilingualism to answer these common questions. The 4 based approaches are foreign, L1, psycho linguistic and social linguistic approach. Each method views learning and developing language in different ways and takes into account different circumstances, situations, disadvantages and advantages.

Snow began with the first basic bilingual approach, The Foreign Language which is a simplistic approach because it focuses on the idea that the best way to learn a second language is to be in the native and social environment of that language. This can affect older and younger learners in different ways. She states that under this approach, young learners such as children will learn a second language better in a social environment of that foreign language. For older learners, being taught by a tutor who is proficient in that foreign language will allow older learners to learn and develop their second language better. This approach does not support the idea that there is a certain critical age where someone needs to learn a second or third language. It also does not support the idea that innate cognitive ability has any emphasis on learning a second language. As a result of this, the Foreign Based approach was later challenged by a L1 Based Approach. Snow states that this approach researches and supports what the Foreign-based model didn't. It explains that many of the characteristics of a first language are part of learning a second language. Which supports their claim that how quickly and adequately a learner learns his/her first language affects how fast and efficiently they can learn a second language. How learners master their language is explained by different methods of learning—what strategies they use, how they're taught by their parents—carry onto their second language acquisition which could be an advantage or disadvantage. However some children or people are not given good learning strategies or are raised by parents that don't particularly speak their own language well which could hinder a children's second language development, let alone first language.

Following the development of two of the four basic bilingual approaches, two more arose—a psycho-linguistic and social linguistic. Snow explains that a psycho-linguistic approach perceives second language development as a special kind of information process. It is understood that the concept of learning and understanding a language is no different from one another. Analytic and auditory skills were utilized allowing learners to develop their second language to the best of their ability. The focus was on the raw cognition and development skills of learners and how these aspects give advantages to them in learning other languages. This approach supports the claim that learners that already know more than one language will be more successful in learning other languages than learners who have only ever understood one language. This approach focuses a lot on the cognitive factors such as the L1 based approach but does not look into other factors that affect learning like the social aspect. This is why Snow brings up the social linguistic research. This approach emphasizes the idea of social context on second language development. This method also supports that learning a second language is tied to personal identity, culture, nation, ethnic pride and many other factors like those given. This also ties into the L1 based approach—learning a second language has the same characteristics of a first language learner—however more strategies and social habits are exploited within their second language environment to get a better understanding of it. This approach has findings which show that more children grow up learning two languages rather than just one which results in a higher probability of developing another language. However this approach could imply that within a social environment where only one language is spoken, it can be very difficult to learn another language—especially when a language learner is in an environment where there is more than one common language.

Snow finishes her section of the article in Educational Researcher with stating that each perspective of bilingualism researchers answers each common question differently. She implies that there is no one research more correct than the other because language development has many different factors and they all can't be expressed in one research approach. This explains why there are multiple bilingual approaches. Each one has their own studies and findings which support their claim, so it's a matter of what kind of parameters are required by researchers who are looking into specific language development experiments.

Literacy development in elementary school second-language learners
Snow was a part of a series of studies that collected data on the language development of bilingual students. This study focused on elementary students who are second-language learners and the relationship between literacy in their first language which translates into literacy into their second language. The research involved in this study was a combination of assessments, data collected on home-language, and school records that determined students' reading ability. The overall project examined cross-language relationships in the classroom and at home. Parents were asked to fill out questionnaires about home language and family reading practices for a better insight. Researchers controlled a variation in teaching methods by studying children only in schools that employed Success for All. Lastly, the reading skills had to be carefully assessed to track the first and second language development and their relations to each other. Researchers examined the student's phonological segmentation, word reading skills, word recognition, and listening and reading comprehension in both Spanish and English. The research concluded that being orally proficient in a first-language will not be enough to develop second-language skills. The work suggested that children need to be literate in their first language to build second-language skills and having instructions in their first language will only be beneficial to their success. On top of first language instructions, teachers need to incorporate English instructions as well to build on to their student's vocabulary and spelling.

Personal
Catherine Snow married Michael Baum from Cedar Falls, Iowa, and they have a son, Nathaniel Baum-Snow. She lives in Brookline, Massachusetts with her husband.

References

External links
 Catherine Elizabeth Snow web page
 Child Language Data Exchange System corpus database

American women psychologists
Educational psychologists
Developmental psycholinguists
Linguists from the United States
Applied linguists
Oberlin College alumni
McGill University alumni
Academic staff of the University of Amsterdam
Harvard Graduate School of Education faculty
1945 births
Living people
American women academics
21st-century American women
American educational psychologists